Vinicius Antonelli (born 1 March 1990) is a water polo player from Brazil. He was part of the Brazilian team at the 2016 Summer Olympics, where the team was eliminated in the quarterfinals.

See also
 Brazil men's Olympic water polo team records and statistics
 List of men's Olympic water polo tournament goalkeepers

References

External links
 

1990 births
Living people
Brazilian male water polo players
Water polo goalkeepers
Water polo players at the 2015 Pan American Games
Pan American Games medalists in water polo
Pan American Games silver medalists for Brazil
Olympic water polo players of Brazil
Water polo players at the 2016 Summer Olympics
Medalists at the 2015 Pan American Games
21st-century Brazilian people